Obsession is a 1976 American neo-noir psychological thriller film directed by Brian De Palma, starring Cliff Robertson, Geneviève Bujold and John Lithgow. The screenplay was written by Paul Schrader, from a story by De Palma and Schrader. Bernard Herrmann provided the film's soundtrack before his death in 1975. The story is about a prominent New Orleans businessman who is haunted by guilt following the death of his wife and daughter during a kidnapping-rescue attempt gone wrong. Years later, he meets and falls in love with a young woman who is the exact look-alike of his long dead wife.

Both De Palma and Schrader have pointed to Alfred Hitchcock's Vertigo (1958) as the major inspiration for Obsessions narrative and thematic concerns. Schrader's script  was extensively rewritten and pared down by De Palma before shooting, causing the screenwriter to proclaim a complete lack of interest in the film's subsequent production and release.

Completed in 1975, Columbia Pictures picked up the distribution rights but demanded that minor changes be made to reduce potentially controversial aspects of the plot. When finally released in the late summer of 1976, it became De Palma's first substantial box-office success and received mixed reviews from critics.

Plot

In 1959, Michael Courtland, a New Orleans real estate developer, has his life shattered when his youthful wife Elizabeth and his little daughter Amy are abducted. The police recommend he provide the kidnappers with a briefcase of plain paper cut into dollars instead of the demanded ransom, as the kidnappers will then be more likely to surrender when cornered rather than flee with cash. Courtland accepts this plan, occasioning a bungled car chase and a spectacular explosion in which the kidnappers and victims perish. Courtland blames himself for his family's passing.

Sixteen years later, in 1975, Courtland is obsessed with his late wife and often visits a monument he has had built in her memory, a replica of the church (the Basilica di San Miniato al Monte) in Florence, Italy where the two of them first met. His business partner Robert LaSalle convinces Courtland to tag along on a work trip to Florence. While there, Courtland revisits the church and finds a young woman named Sandra who resembles his late wife. The already slightly unhinged Courtland begins to court Sandra and subtly attempts to transform her into Elizabeth's duplicate.

Courtland returns to New Orleans with Sandra so they can marry. On their wedding night, Sandra is kidnapped and a note left by her abductors that is a replica of the kidnappers' message sixteen years ago. This time, Courtland decides to deliver the ransom though it will drive him to ruin, withdrawing massive amounts from his accounts and holdings and signing over his interest in the real estate business to LaSalle. This leads him to the discovery that everything, including the original kidnapping, had been engineered by LaSalle to control Courtland's shares. The now nearly insane Courtland stabs LaSalle to death.

Knowing Sandra must have been an accomplice in the plot, he goes to the airport to kill her. Before boarding the plane, it is revealed in a flashback that Sandra is Courtland's daughter Amy. Following the original kidnapping, LaSalle concealed Amy's survival and sent her to dwell in secret with an Italian caretaker who raised her as her own and named her Sandra. Down the years, LaSalle deceived Sandra about Courtland, convincing her Courtland failed to furnish the ransom as he did not love her enough. Sandra, who has come to love Courtland, attempts suicide on the plane and departs the flight in a wheelchair. Courtland sees and runs at her, gun drawn. A security guard attempts to halt him, but Courtland stuns the staff with the money-laden briefcase, spilling its contents. Sandra, sighting fluttering bills, stands and shouts: "Daddy! You brought the money!" Courtland apprehends at last Sandra's identity, and father and daughter embrace.

Cast

Production
De Palma and Schrader devised a story with a narrative inspired by Alfred Hitchcock's Vertigo, a film both admired. Schrader's original screenplay, titled Déjà Vu, was reportedly much longer than the final film, with a coda that extended another 10 years beyond where the film now ends. De Palma ultimately found Schrader's screenplay unfilmable due to its length, and rewrote and condensed the finale after Schrader refused to make the requested changes. According to De Palma, "Paul Schrader's ending actually went on for another act of obsession. I felt it was much too complicated, and wouldn't sustain, so I abbreviated it." Bernard Herrmann, the film's composer, agreed that the original ending should be jettisoned, telling De Palma after reading Schrader's version "Get rid of it — that'll never work".  Schrader remained resentful of De Palma's rewrite for years and claimed to have lost all interest in the project once the change was made. Schrader indicated that "the original three-part story conclude with a section set in the future (1985). My original idea in the script was to write an obsessive love where transcended the normal strictures of time."

De Palma said "It made Schrader very unhappy: he thought I'd truncated his masterpiece. He's never been the same since." Schrader stated that "the future section was cut from the script for budgetary reasons"; however rumor had it that Bernard Herrmann suggested the cuts when he was working on the score for the film because he felt the last third set in the future didn't work. In 2011, Schrader's full three-part script was released as part of the Arrow Video Blu-ray.

After the film was completed, Bernard Herrmann considered it the finest film in his musical career.

Columbia executives expressed unease over the incest theme, especially as it was portrayed in such a heavily romanticized manner. Consequently, a few minor changes were made to a pivotal sequence between Robertson and Bujold, in which dissolves and visual "ripples" were inserted over the wedding and post-wedding scenes to suggest that the consummation of their marriage only took place in a dream sequence. Paul Hirsch, the film's editor, agreed with the decision to obscure the incest theme, noting "I thought it was a mistake to drag incest into what was basically a romantic mystery, so I suggested to Brian 'What if it never happened? What if instead of having them get married, Michael only dreams of getting married? We have this shot of Cliff Robertson asleep. We could use that and then cut to the wedding sequence.' And that's what we did. It became a projection of his desires rather than actual fact."

In the documentary De Palma, the director indicated that he felt the major flaw of the film was in casting Cliff Robertson. De Palma felt that Robertson couldn't play the anguish of the character, and was frequently difficult on-set. De Palma was effusive in his praise of Bujold who he felt had the more difficult role, which she played admirably, giving the film the emotional resonance needed for the project.

Reception
The film was an unexpected financial success. Columbia held on to the movie for almost a year before sending it into theaters in late August, traditionally the "dog days" of movie attendance. Obsession had managed to obtain enough positive critical notices to spark interest, and it earned the distributor over $4 million in domestic (U.S. and Canada) rentals.

Initial critical reaction to Obsession was mixed. Roger Ebert wrote "Brian De Palma's Obsession is an overwrought melodrama, and that's what I like best about it...I don't just like movies like these; I relish them. Sometimes overwrought excess can be its own reward. If Obsession had been even a little more subtle, had made even a little more sense on some boring logical plane, it wouldn't have worked at all." Variety'''s review described it as "an excellent romantic and non-violent suspense drama...Paul Schrader's script...is a complex but comprehensible mix of treachery, torment and selfishness..."
In Time, Richard Schickel called the film "...exquisite entertainment...The film also throws into high melodramatic relief certain recognizable human truths: the shock of sudden loss, the panic of the effort to recoup, the mourning and guilt that blind the protagonist to a multitude of suspicious signs as he seeks expiation and a chance to relive his life. In a sense, the movie offers viewers the opportunity to do the same thing—by going back to a more romantic era of the cinema and the simple, touching pleasures denied the audience by the current antiromantic spirit of the movies."     
Other reviewers praised the stylish cinematography by Vilmos Zsigmond, and Bernard Herrmann's beautiful, highly romantic score was one of the more acclaimed in his distinguished career, earning him a posthumous Academy Award nomination (the composer died in December 1975, a few hours after completing the score of Martin Scorsese's Taxi Driver). The National Board of Review named Obsession one of the Top Ten Films of 1976.

But several critics complained that the film was all too clearly a mere homage to Vertigo, without being original or interesting enough in itself as a thriller. Pauline Kael, normally one of De Palma's greatest admirers, dismissed the film as "no more than an exercise in style, with the camera whirling around nothingness..." Vincent Canby wrote "To be blunt, Obsession is no Vertigo, Hitchcock's witty, sardonic study of obsession that did transcend its material, which wasn't all that bad to start with. The Schrader screenplay...is most effective when it's most romantic, and transparent when it attempts to be mysterious...The plot...is such that you'll probably have figured out the mystery very early."

Decades later, Obsessions reputation improved considerably. Rotten Tomatoes lists the film as having a 73% favorability rating, based on the critiques of a sampling of 26 reviewers. The site's consensus reads: "Obsession'' suffers in comparison to the Alfred Hitchcock masterpiece that it mirrors, but director Brian De Palma's unique preoccupations give this thriller its own compulsive, twisted fingerprint".

Soundtrack

The CD soundtrack composed and conducted by Bernard Herrmann is available on Music Box Records label. Disc one presents "The Film Score" and disc two, "The Original 1976 Soundtrack Album". "complete film score" was recorded by the City of Prague Orchestra and Chorus, conducted by Nic Raine (Tadlow 2015). It includes a second disc Blu-ray CD recording of the session.

References

External links
 
 
 
 
 
 The Making of Obsession
 Reviews of two Obsession soundtrack recordings

1976 films
1970s mystery films
1970s psychological thriller films
American mystery films
American psychological thriller films
Columbia Pictures films
Films about kidnapping
Films directed by Brian De Palma
Films scored by Bernard Herrmann
Films set in 1959
Films set in 1975
Films set in New Orleans
Films shot in New Orleans
Incest in film
Films with screenplays by Paul Schrader
American neo-noir films
Films shot in Florence
Films set in Florence
1970s English-language films
1970s American films